Warren County Career Center, located in Warren, Pennsylvania, serves the four high schools (Eisenhower, Sheffield Area, Warren Area and Youngsville) that make up the Warren County School District. Students in grades 10-12 from these schools have the opportunity to attend here for one-half of the school day, while spending the other one-half in their respective High School.

Course Offerings
There are twelve course offerings at WCCC

 Auto Body Collision Technology
 Auto Technology
 Building Construction Occupations (BCO)
 Information Technology
 Electronics Technology
 Food Production and Management
 Health/Medical Assisting
 Machine Technology
 Marketing Technology
 Power Equipment Technology
 Pre-Engineering / Drafting
 Welding Technology

Tech Prep Program
All WCCC programs are articulated with programs at the Pennsylvania College of Technology. In addition, a student attending the Career Center may  be able to attain Advanced Placement credits with other post-secondary institutions in the tri-state area.

Cooperative Education Program
Some Juniors and all Seniors attending the Career Center have the opportunity to participate in the Cooperative-Education  program, in which the student would be able to have hand-in-hand classroom and employment training, overseen by a certified cooperative-education instructor.

References

Schools in Warren County, Pennsylvania
Buildings and structures in Warren, Pennsylvania
Public high schools in Pennsylvania